Hieracium murorum, the wall hawkweed, is a species of flowering plant in the family Asteraceae. It is native to Europe and naturalized in some of the colder regions of North America.

References

External links
Photo of herbarium specimen at Missouri Botanical Garden, collected near Seattle, Washington, in 2013

murorum
Flora of Europe
Plants described in 1753
Taxa named by Carl Linnaeus